Reina de reinas: La Virgen María ("Queen of Queens: The Virgin Mary") is a 1948 Mexican film. It stars Luis Alcoriza.

External links
 

1948 films
1940s Spanish-language films
Portrayals of the Virgin Mary in film
Mexican black-and-white films
Mexican drama films
1948 drama films
1940s Mexican films